KNUQ (103.9 FM, "Q 103") is a radio station licensed to serve Paauilo, Hawaii. The station is owned by Visionary Related Entertainment, LLC. It airs a World Ethnic music format.

The station was assigned the KNUQ call letters by the Federal Communications Commission on September 22, 1994.

Translators and booster

Previous Logos

Logo previously used before frequency change from 103.7 FM to 103.9 FM

References

External links
KNUQ official website
KOAI Radio Group

NUQ
Hawaiian-music formatted radio stations
Hawaii (island)
Radio stations established in 1994
1994 establishments in Hawaii